Dichomeris bispotalis is a moth in the family Gelechiidae. It was described by Walia and Wadhawan in 2004. It is found in India.

References

Moths described in 2004
bispotalis